Manuela Landgraf is a former East German pair skater. She won the 1984 World Junior Figure Skating Championships with partner Ingo Steuer.

Competitive highlights 
(With Steuer)

References

Navigation 

German female pair skaters
Living people
World Junior Figure Skating Championships medalists
Year of birth missing (living people)